WRBW (channel 65), branded on-air as Fox 35 Plus, is a television station in Orlando, Florida, United States, airing programming from MyNetworkTV. It is owned and operated by Fox Television Stations alongside Fox outlet WOFL (channel 35). Both stations share studios on Skyline Drive in Lake Mary, while WRBW's transmitter is located in unincorporated Bithlo, Florida.

History
The station began operation as an independent station on June 6, 1994, airing vintage sitcoms, cartoons and older movies. It was owned by Rainbow Media, a subsidiary of Cablevision Systems Corporation. It originally operated from studio facilities located on the backlot of Universal Studios Florida. WRBW became the Orlando area affiliate of the United Paramount Network (UPN) (a network created by BHC and Paramount), when the network debuted on January 16, 1995. Since UPN only provided two hours of network programming two nights a week at launch, WRBW essentially still programmed itself as an independent station. During the late 1990s, especially during the wildfire plagued summer of 1998, there were occasions to which ABC Sports programming was moved to channel 65 in order for the market's ABC affiliate WFTV (channel 9) to provide wall-to-wall news coverage. Some of ABC's Saturday morning children's programs also aired on WRBW, until WRDQ signed on the air in April 2000.

Chris-Craft Industries, part-owner of UPN (through its United Television unit) bought the station in 1998, making WRBW the first owned-and-operated station of a major network in the Orlando market. Fox Television Stations acquired most of Chris-Craft's television stations, including WRBW, in 2001. Fox did not consider moving its affiliation from WOFL to WRBW, however; not only was WOFL one of Fox's strongest affiliates, but WRBW was located on a very high channel number. The buyout of Chris-Craft's stake in UPN by Viacom (which owned 50% of UPN since 1996) and the subsequent purchase of WRBW by Fox effectively stripped the station of its status as a UPN owned-and-operated station. A few months after the Chris-Craft deal closed, Fox traded KPTV in Portland, Oregon to Meredith Corporation in return for WOFL (and its Ocala-based semi-satellite WOGX), giving the company a duopoly in the Orlando market when the deal was finalized on June 17, 2002. Fox subsequently moved WRBW's operations to the WOFL studios in Lake Mary.

On January 24, 2006, CBS Corporation (the restructured original Viacom, which acquired UPN, after CBS and Viacom split and spun off a separate company carrying the Viacom name in December 2005) and Time Warner announced that UPN and The WB would be shut down, and replaced by a new network that would feature some of the higher-rated programs from both networks called The CW Television Network. The CW's initial list of stations did not include any of Fox's UPN affiliates; as a result, Fox removed all network references and branding from its UPN affiliates, and stopped promoting the network's programming. Accordingly, WRBW began branding itself as "WRBW 65" (WRBW's website, however, retained the "UPN 65" logo until just over a week after the change). On March 1, 2006, WB affiliate WKCF was announced as the Orlando area affiliate of The CW. It was very unlikely, however, that WRBW would have been selected in any event. The CW's management was on record as preferring to affiliate with the "strongest" stations in terms of viewership among UPN and The WB's affiliates, and WKCF had been The WB's strongest affiliate for virtually all of that network's run.

On February 22, 2006—less than a month after the formation of The CW—Fox announced the formation of MyNetworkTV, with WRBW and the other Fox-owned UPN stations as the nuclei. With the impending switch to MyNetworkTV, channel 65's on-air branding was changed to "My 65" beginning in May 2006. Despite MyNetworkTV's announcement that its launch date would be September 5, 2006, UPN continued to broadcast on stations across the country until September 15, 2006. While some UPN affiliates that switched to MyNetworkTV aired the final two weeks of UPN programming outside its regular primetime period, WRBW and the rest of the network's Fox-owned affiliates dropped UPN's programming entirely on August 31, 2006. The launch of MyNetworkTV made WOFL and WRBW the only English-language network-owned stations in the market.
In August 2019, Fox announced that WRBW would rebrand as "Fox 35 Plus" on September 9, serving as a brand extension of WOFL.

Technical information

Subchannels
The station's ATSC 1.0 channels are carried on the multiplexed digital signals of other Orlando television stations:

WRBW had previously broadcast a color test pattern and tone on digital subchannel 65.2. However, the subchannel has also been used occasionally to provide a 480i standard definition feed of the signals of co-owned WOFL, that station's Ocala semi-satellite WOGX or even WRBW's own programming at times. Digital subchannel 65.2 began regular use on August 27, 2012, with the addition of Bounce TV, through a groupwide affiliation deal between the network and Fox Television Stations.

Analog-to-digital conversion 
WRBW ended programming on its analog signal, on UHF channel 65, on June 12, 2009, as part of the federally mandated transition from analog to digital television. The station's digital signal continued to broadcast on its pre-transition UHF channel 41. Through the use of PSIP, digital television receivers display the station's virtual channel as its former UHF analog channel 65, which was one of the high band UHF channels (52-69) that were removed as a result of the transition.

ATSC 3.0 lighthouse

Programming

Syndicated programming
Syndicated programming on WRBW includes Divorce Court, Burn Notice, The Wendy Williams Show, Judge Judy, The People’s Court and The Big Bang Theory. Occasionally, the station may take on the responsibility of running Fox network programming in lieu of its regular schedule, whenever WOFL cannot in the event of extended breaking news coverage; until 2019, this arrangement included Fox Sports telcasts that conflicted with WOFL's contractual obligations to show ACC college sports programming from Raycom Sports. In addition, much of WOFL's syndicated programming temporarily moved to WRBW to accommodate coverage of the George Zimmerman trial on WOFL; this included some programs already seen on WRBW in other time slots, as well as Dr. Phil, though little inconvenience was expected as only Wendy Williams had original shows, with the remainder of syndicated shows either on summer hiatus or canceled.

Newscasts
In the 1990s, ABC affiliate WFTV began producing a 10 p.m. newscast for WRBW under a news share agreement; the program later moved to independent station WRDQ, after that station signed on in April 2000 due to a local marketing agreement with that station and WFTV's owner Cox Media Group.

As part of WRBW's rebranding to "Fox 35 Plus", an 8 p.m. newscast produced by WOFL premiered on September 9, 2019.

In 2022, WRBW began simulcasting programming from Fox Weather. This programming airs from 10 to 11 a.m. on weekdays, with an extra hour from 11 a.m. to noon on Saturdays.

Sports programming
In 2019, Major League Soccer team Orlando City SC signed a multi-year deal with WRBW to broadcast locally-televised matches.

References

External links

MyNetworkTV affiliates
Movies! affiliates
Buzzr affiliates
Fox Television Stations
Television channels and stations established in 1994
RBW
1994 establishments in Florida
Heroes & Icons affiliates
ATSC 3.0 television stations